Heini Ihle (born 24 April 1941) is a German ski jumper. He competed in the normal hill and large hill events at the 1968 Winter Olympics.

References

External links
 

1941 births
Living people
German male ski jumpers
Olympic ski jumpers of West Germany
Ski jumpers at the 1968 Winter Olympics
People from Oberstdorf
Sportspeople from Swabia (Bavaria)
20th-century German people